Zijpe is a former municipality in the Netherlands, in the province of North Holland. In 2013, Zijpe and Harenkarspel merged into Schagen.

Population centres 
The former municipality of Zijpe consisted of the following cities, towns, villages and/or districts: Burgerbrug, Burgervlotbrug, Callantsoog, Groote Keeten, Oudesluis, Petten, Schagerbrug, Sint Maartensbrug, Sint Maartensvlotbrug, 't Zand.

Local government 
The municipal council of Zijpe consisted of 15 seats, which were divided as follows:

 BKV - 5 seats
 CDA - 5 seats
 PvdA - 3 seats
 VVD - 2 seats

External links
City Site (Dutch)
Nieuws over Zijpe (Dutch)
Alles over Schagen FM, de lokale omroep voor Schagen, Zijpe, Niedorp en Harenkarspel (Dutch)

Schagen
Former municipalities of North Holland
Municipalities of the Netherlands disestablished in 2013